Bryan W. Ball  (born 11 July 1935) is a British theologian, author, teacher, former President of Avondale College and former President of the Seventh-day Adventist Church in the South Pacific.

Biography
Bryan William Ball was born in Bere Ferrers, Devon, England on 11 July 1935, the son of Cecil William Richard Ball and Nora (née Beardsell).

Ball was educated at Bedford Modern School and Tavistock Grammar School. He graduated BA from Newbold College, MA in Religion from Andrews University and was awarded a PhD from the University of London.

Ball was Chair of Theology at Newbold College between 1976 and 1984. In 1984 he moved to Australia to become President of Avondale College between 1984 and 1990. He was later made President of the South Pacific Division between 1990 and 1997 where he was instrumental in the further development of the Sydney Adventist Hospital and helped the Pacific Adventist College in Papua New Guinea achieve university status.

Ball is a widely cited scholar who has written extensively on current and historical theological issues.

Selected bibliography

 A great expectation: eschatological thought in English Protestantism to 1660.  Published by Brill, Leiden, 1975
 The English connection: the Puritan roots of Seventh-Day Adventist belief.  Published by J. Clarke, Cambridge, England, 1981
 The Seventh-day Men: Sabbatarians and Sabbatarianism in England and Wales, 1600-1800.  Published by Oxford University Press, Oxford and New York City, 1994
 The essential Jesus: the man, His message, His mission.  Published by Pacific Press Publishing Association, Nampa, Idaho, 2002; Warburton, Victoria, Australia, 2002
 Christopher Feake 1612-1683.  Entry in the DNB, Oxford University Press, 2004
 Can we still believe the Bible? : and does it really matter?  Published by Signs Publishing Company, Victoria, Australia, 2007
 The soul sleepers: Christian mortalism from Wycliffe to Priestley.  Published by James Clarke & Co., Cambridge, 2008
 In the beginning: science and scripture confirm creation.  Published by Pacific Press Publishing Association, Nampa, Idaho, 2012

References

External links
 Bryan W. Ball at WorldCat

1935 births
Living people
Seventh-day Adventist theologians
Andrews University alumni
Alumni of the University of London
People educated at Bedford Modern School
People from the Borough of West Devon
English Seventh-day Adventists
British emigrants to Australia